Cashmere is the second album of the band with the same name, released in 1985 by Philly World Records (and distributed by Atlantic Records). This album also includes their previous 1984 hit "Can I?".

Reception
Craig Lytle of AllMusic states that: "with the rapid advancement of studio gimmickry and keyboard technology, Cashmere sacrifices the authenticity of real instruments. However, they remain true to the vocality of their music."

Track listing
Side A
 "Can I"  – 6:27
 "Someone Like You"  – 6:04
 "Fascination"   - 5:10
 "You're All I Need"    – 4:18
Side B
 "We Need Love"   – 4:45
 "Keep Me Up "  – 5:47
 "Cutie Pie"   – 4:18
 "Don't Keep Me Waiting"   – 4:19

Personnel

"Can I"
Bruce Weeden – mixing, soloist, electric guitar 
Donald R. Robinson – rhythm arrangement
Dennis Richardson,  Eugene  Curry - synthesizer
Producer, rhythm arrangement – Bobby Eli

"Someone Like You" 
Donald R. Robinson – rhythm arrangement
Bruce Weeden – mixing
Dennis Richardson, Eugene  Curry - synthesizer
Producer, rhythm arrangement – Bobby Eli

"Fascination" (Vocal) 
Ron Dean Miller – producer, rhythm arrangement, backing vocals
Donald R. Robinson – rhythm arrangement
 Khris Kellow –  synthesizer
Bruce Weeden – mixing

"Spasticus Autisticus" (Version) 
 Doug Grisby – bass guitar
Jack Faith – strings arrangement 
Don Renaldo – strings
Donald R. Robinson, Michael Forte – rhythm arrangement, producer

"We Need Love" 
Don Renaldo – strings
Norman Harris – strings arrangement 
Khris Kellow –  synthesizer
Ron Dean Miller – producer, rhythm arrangement, backing vocals

"Keep Me Up" 
Willie Williams – soloist, saxophone
Donald R. Robinson, Michael Forte – producer

"Cutie Pie" 
 Bunny Sigler – rhythm arrangement, producer

"Don't Keep Me Waiting" 
Donald R. Robinson – rhythm arrangement
 Daryl Burgee –  percussion
Michael Forte – producer

Chart performance

References

1985 albums
Boogie albums
Dance-pop albums by American artists
Soul albums by American artists
Atlantic Records albums